Francis Jno-Baptiste (born 8 November 1999) is an English professional footballer who plays as a forward for USL League One club Forward Madison FC.

Career
In January 2019, having spent six years at the Crystal Palace academy, Jno-Baptiste joined Allsvenskan side Östersund, signing a three-and-a-half year deal. On 23 February 2019, he made his senior debut for Östersund in the Svenska Cupen, playing the final 18 minutes during a 3–2 loss to Karlstad. On 29 June 2019, he made his Allsvenskan debut as a substitute in a 0–0 draw with Göteborg. On 12 June 2020, Jno-Baptiste joined Superettan side AFC Eskilstuna on loan. In January 2022, Jno-Baptiste mutually agreed to terminate his contract with Östersund.

On 10 March 2022, Jno-Baptiste returned to England to sign for Southern League Premier Division South side Chesham United. On 1 November 2022, Jno-Baptiste was announced to have signed for Isthmian League Premier Division club Brightlingsea Regent having featured in their defeat at the weekend prior.

On 1 February 2023, American club Forward Madison of USL League One announced the signing of Jno-Baptiste for their 2023 season.

References

External links

1999 births
Living people
English footballers
Association football forwards
Footballers from the London Borough of Newham
Östersunds FK players
AFC Eskilstuna players
Chesham United F.C. players
Brightlingsea Regent F.C. players
Forward Madison FC players
Allsvenskan players
Superettan players
Southern Football League players
Isthmian League players
USL League One players
English expatriate footballers
English expatriate sportspeople in Sweden
English expatriate sportspeople in the United States
Expatriate soccer players in the United States
Black British sportspeople